Empire Baron was a  cargo ship which was built in 1926 for Navigazione Generale Gerolimich & Compagnia Società in Anzioni, Trieste, Italy. She was captured by the Royal Navy in 1940 and ownership passed to the Ministry of War Transport (MoWT). She was  renamed Empire Baron. She was sold in 1947 to Navigation & Coal Trade Ltd, London  and renamed Rubystone. She was sold to a Panamanian company in 1951 and was scrapped in 1960.

History

Pre-war
Monte Piana was built by Cantiere Navale Triestino, Monfalcone for Navigazione Generale Gerolimich & Compagnia Società in Anzioni, Trieste. She was completed in July 1926 and named after the Northern Italian mountain of the same name. On 18 June 1933, Monte Piana was in collision with the Greek ship  in the River Plate, in Argentine waters. Both ships sustained damage to their bows, with their forepeaks flooded. On 18 May 1937, Monte Piana departed Calcutta, India for Genoa, Italy. A fire broke out in one of her holds. It was brought under control and Monte Piana returned to port.

War service
On 10 June 1940, Monte Piana was captured by the Royal Navy at Aden. She was beached after her crew attempted to scuttle her. In 1941, her ownership was passed to the MoWT. Attempts to repair her electrical system and engines at Aden were unsuccessful, and she was towed to Vizagapatam, India by SS Nirvana, arriving on 23 February 1941. She was repaired and placed under the management of British-India Steam Navigation Company. Repairs were completed by June 1941 as Monte Piana sailed from Calcutta on 10 June, arriving at Rangoon, Burma on 9 July. She departed Calcutta on 19 August 1941 and joined Convoy SL 93 which departed Freetown, Sierra Leone on 19 November 1941 and arrived at Liverpool on 10 December. She was carrying a cargo of tea, jute and pig iron and was bound for Oban, Argyllshire. She then sailed to Dundee. At some point, Monte Piana was renamed Empire Baron. Although this name change took place on paper in 1941, she was still operating under the name Monte Piana in 1942. Empire Baron was a member of a number of convoys during the Second World War

OS 34
Convoy OS 34 departed Liverpool on 11 July 1942 and arrived at Freetown on 30 July. Empire Baron had started her voyage at Oban and was bound for Durban and Calcutta with a load of Government stores.

OS 58
Convoy OS 58 departed Liverpool on 5 November 1943 and arrived at Freetown on 28 November. Empire Baron had started her voyage at the Clyde and was bound for Cape Town and East London, South Africa and then Basra, Iraq.

MKS 43
Convoy MKS 43 sailed from Gibraltar on 22 March 1944 and arrived at Liverpool on 4 April 1944. Empire Baron had started her voyage at Mombasa, Kenya and called at Beira, Mozambique. She was carrying a cargo of Chrome ore, general cargo and mails and was bound for Loch Ewe.

KMS 61
Convoy KMS 61 sailed from Liverpool on 25 August 1944 and arrived at Gibraltar on 4 September. Empire Baron had started her voyage at Belfast and was bound for Port Said, Egypt with a cargo of coal.

Postwar
In 1947, Empire Baron was sold to Navigation & Coal Trade Ltd, London and renamed Rubystone. She was operated by them for four years before being sold in 1951 to Alvion Steamship Co, Panama. Rubystone was scrapped in August 1960 at Nagasaki, Japan.

Propulsion

Official number and code letters
Official Numbers were a forerunner to IMO Numbers. Monte Piana had the Italian Official Number 258 until 1940 and the UK Official Number from 1940. She used the Code Letters NZLO until 1933. IBJX from 1934, and  ZNAH from 1941. Empire Baron had the UK Official Number 174207 and used the Code Letters BCSN

References

1926 ships
Ships built in Trieste
Merchant ships of Italy
World War II merchant ships of Italy
Ministry of War Transport ships
Empire ships
Merchant ships of the United Kingdom
Merchant ships of Panama
Captured ships
Maritime incidents in 1933
Maritime incidents in 1937
Maritime incidents in June 1940